Mitsuyasu (written: 光泰 or 光保) is a masculine Japanese given name. Notable people with the name include:

, Japanese samurai and daimyō
, Japanese actor

Japanese masculine given names